Stanley Kaoni is a militant leader in the Solomon Islands. He is an albino, and is known on the islands as Sataan or Satan. He was formerly a commander of the Isatabu Freedom Movement. 

Kaoni was arrested in 2003 and convicted in 2005 of crimes including robbery and abduction.

See also
 Harold Keke

References

Solomon Islands rebels
People with albinism
Living people
Year of birth missing (living people)